Seetla Mata is a folk deity forming part of Punjabi folk religion. Seetla  is the goddess of smallpox and is worshiped for its recovery. She also manifests herself in the form of chicken pox and is venerated for recovery.

Origins
The cult of Seetla Mata belongs to prehistoric period and is linked to the Harrappa civilisation. On one of the seals found in Harrappa there are the figures of seven girls with long hair. These are believed to be Seetla Mata and her six sisters.

Sisters
Seetla Mata is sometimes depicted as having six sisters, and at other times as the eldest of eight sisters, all of whom cause pustular diseases and are venerated for recovery. The sisters are: Masani, Basanti, Maha mai, Polamde, Lamkaria and Agwani. There shrines cluster around the central shrine of Seetla Mata. One of them is called Paharwali or of the mountain. In Punjabi, the shrines of the sisters of Seetla Mata are called "matya".

Representation of Seetla Mata

Seetla Mata has the following features:
 Her face is hideous.
 Her teeth are projecting.
 Her ears are as large as winnowing fan.
 Her eyes are huge.
 Mouth is wide open.
 She rides an ass.
 She carries a huge broom in one hand.
 She has a pitcher and an ewer in the other hand.
 She has a winnowing fan on her head.
 She has a snake as a whip.

Worship
Seetla Mata may be worshiped at any time of the year. However, the annual period of worship is the Punjabi month of Chait (March–April) as per the Punjabi calendar. Generally, she is worshiped early in the mornings of Monday, Tuesday and Wednesday.

The month of Chait is important in Punjabi culture as it is the last month of the Punjabi calendar and is the season in which wheat ripens. Also, the season is of Basant (spring). One of Seetla Mata's name is Basanti and therefore, she represents the negative side of Basant and is therefore worshiped.

Trees
Seetla Mata and her sisters reside on the trees of the neem (Azdiracta indica), kikar (Acacia arabica) or jand (Prosopis specigera).

Shrine
The shrines are situated on the banks of ponds. The shrine itself are made of some bricks and have no regular priests.

The most important shrines at which large annual fairs are held are at the shrines of Seel village in Patiala and at the shrine of Jarg   village in Ludhiana district.

Fairs
Jarag fair is one of the important fairs of Punjab that is held in Jarg, a village in tehsil Pail and district Ludhiana. The fair is also known as Baheria Fair. It is organised in the month of Cheth (March–April), in the honor of the Seetla Mata. On the day of the fair, the devotees of Seetla Mata gather near the pond and scoop a portion of the earth to form a mound. The mound is revered as the shrine of the Goddess.

Prayers and pujas are conducted at the Jarg Fair. Sweet gulgula (jaggery cakes) are made one day prior to the fair and offered to the Goddess on the day of fair. The sweets are then offered to the donkeys, which are the favorite of the Goddess. Donkeys are specially decorated for the occasion, with potters cladding them in attractive colorful blankets. Some even put bells or conch shells and beads around their neck.

Temporary stalls are set up and the fair hosts cultural programmes.

Veneration in other areas
Seetla Mata is worshiped in various parts of India, Pakistan, Nepal and Bangladesh. However, the origins and the form of worship varies from region to region.

Folk form of Seetla Mata and Shitala in Hinduism
Seetla Mata has been integrated into Hinduism. However, her birth is explained in a different manner to the legends prevalent in the Punjab. In Hinduism, she is known as Shitala and is not one of seven sisters.

Shitala is accompanied by Jvarasura, the fever demon, Oladevi, the cholera goddess, Ghentu-debata, the god of skin diseases, Raktabati, the goddess of blood infections and the sixty-four epidemics. Shitala is represented as a young maiden crowned with a winnowing-fan, riding an ass, holding a short broom (either to spread or dust off germs) and a pot full of pulses (the viruses) or cold water (a healing tool).

References

Punjabi folk religion